Hillevåg Church is a parish church of the Church of Norway in the southern part of the large Stavanger Municipality in Rogaland county, Norway. It is located in the borough of Hillevåg in the central part of the city of Stavanger. It is the church for the Hillevåg parish which is part of the Ytre Stavanger prosti (deanery) in the Diocese of Stavanger. The white, concrete church was built in a rectangular design in 1961 using designs by the architects Valdemar Hansteen and Erik Thesen. The church seats about 370 people.

See also
List of churches in Rogaland

References

Churches in Stavanger
20th-century Church of Norway church buildings
Churches completed in 1961
1961 establishments in Norway